This is a complete list of members of the United States Senate during the 7th United States Congress listed by seniority, from March 4, 1801, to March 3, 1803.

The order of service is based on the commencement of the senator's first term, with senators entering service the same day ranked alphabetically.

The two main parties in the 7th Congress were the Federalists (F), and Democratic Republicans (DR).

Terms of service

U.S. Senate seniority list

Notes

External links

007